Two ships of the Royal Australian Navy have been named HMAS Shepparton, after the city of Shepparton, Victoria.

, a Bathurst-class corvette launched in 1942 and sold for scrap in 1958
, a Paluma-class survey vessel launched in 1989 and active as of 2016

Battle honours
Ships named HMAS Shepparton are entitled to carry two battle honours:
Pacific 1943
New Guinea 1943–44

References

Royal Australian Navy ship names